Tang-e Nakhl is a village in Abdan Rural District, in the Central District of Deyr County, Bushehr Province, Iran. At the 2006 census, its population was 18 in 5 families.

References 

Populated places in Deyr County